Where is the Green Sheep? is a children's picture book written by Mem Fox and illustrated by Judy Horacek. Published by Penguin Books, It is about various coloured sheep doing various things, with the protagonist, the green sheep, not being seen until the final pages.

Reception
Booklist wrote: "Little ones will bounce with anticipation as the simple yet clever text takes them to visit one sheep and then another. .. Laughs and interactive play will ensue among readers and listeners, alone or in groups". School Library Journal wrote: "Basic beginning vocabulary is repeated in this easy-to-read rhyme about different kinds of sheep. .. A welcome addition to the year's flock of easy-readers".

Kirkus Reviews called it "ideally easy and well-designed". Publishers Weekly wrote that "parents intrigued by Fox's ideas about early literacy (as expounded in Reading Magic, for example) will find this book a useful vehicle for putting her suggestions into practice". The Horn Book Magazine wrote: "And here's a book one doesn't see every day: a narrative perfectly attuned to a toddler's sense of playful discovery. .. Horacek's uncluttered watercolors merrily counterbalance the straightforward text and provide numerous opportunities for listeners to identify colors and animals as well as to count objects", and concluded "..this bedtime story is as satisfying as a goodnight kiss".
January Magazine''', in its review, wrote: "..this book is .. aimed squarely at children, though it is a surprise for those who know the artist's other work to see her mark on this book", and described it as "a joyous romp through the lives of sheep" and "a perfect book for bedtime reading with your toddler".Where is The Green Sheep? appears on the School Library Journal Top 100 Picture Books List and the New York Public Library 100 Great Children's Books of the Last 100 Years list.

Awards and nominations
2004 Horn Book Fanfare Book
2005 Children's Book Council of Australia Book of the Year: Early Childhood - winner
2006 Kids Own Australian Literature Awards (KOALA) - Top 10
2007 KOALA - Top 10
2008 KOALA - Honour
See also
 Good Night, Sleep Tight Ducks Away! Bonnie and Ben Rhyme Again''
 Mem Fox
 Judy Horacek

References

External links

 Library holdings of Where Is the Green Sheep?

2004 children's books
Australian children's books
Fictional sheep
Picture books by Mem Fox
Australian picture books